Charles C. Dauner (January 5, 1912 – March 21, 1993) was an American male handball player. He was a member of the United States men's national handball team. He was a part of the  team at the 1936 Summer Olympics, playing 1 match. On club level he played for German Sport Club Brooklyn in the United States.

References

1912 births
1993 deaths
American male handball players
Field handball players at the 1936 Summer Olympics
Olympic handball players of the United States
People from Elmhurst, Queens